Nucleoplasmin-3 is a protein that in humans is encoded by the NPM3 gene.

The protein encoded by this gene is related to the nuclear chaperone phosphoproteins, nucleoplasmin and nucleophosmin.  It is highly homologous to the murine Npm3 gene.  Based on the structural similarity of the human NPM3 gene product to nucleoplasmin and nucleophosmin, NPM3 may represent a new member of this gene family, and may share basic functions with the molecular chaperones.

References

Further reading

External links